Zvezda is a Russian literary magazine published in Saint Petersburg since 1924. It began as a bimonthly, but has been monthly since 1927.

History 
The first issue of Zvezda appeared in January 1924, with Ivan Maisky as editor-in-chief. Katerina Clark writes, in a discussion of the new journals founded at this time:Unlike Moscow, Petrograd was given only one "thick" journal, the Star (Zvezda), which was less important and had a smaller circulation than its Moscow counterparts, which were thus able to lure away the more successful or acceptable Petrograd writers.... [Zvezda] functioned as a medium through which fringe figures on the left (proletarian extremists) and the right (such as Pilnyak, Pasternak, and Mandelshtam) could publish. While this situation afforded Petrograd the role of the more honorable, less compromised city, to some it seemed the town of the has-beens.
Aside from the authors mentioned by Clark, in its early years Zvezda published Maxim Gorky, Nikolay Zabolotsky, Mikhail Zoshchenko, Veniamin Kaverin, Nikolai Klyuev, Boris Lavrenyov, Konstantin Fedin, Vladislav Khodasevich, and Yury Tynyanov, among others. It survived the difficult circumstances of the Siege of Leningrad, and after the war published works by such writers as Vera Panova, Daniil Granin, Vsevolod Kochetov, and Yury German. However, it was severely criticized during the Zhdanovschina cultural attacks of 1946 for publishing Zoshchenko and Anna Akhmatova.

Today it is collectively owned by its editorial staff. Its regular sections are "Russia and the Caucasus," "Philosophical commentary," "Memoirs of the 20th century," "People and fate," and "Prose and verse." Once a year it publishes a special issue dedicated to a prominent author or phenomenon.

Editors-in-chief
 1924 — Ivan Maisky
 1925-1926 — Georgy Gorbachev
 1926-1928 — Petr Petrovsky
 1929-1937 — Yury Libedinsky
 1939-1940 — Georgy Kholopov
 1945-1946 — Vissarion Sayanov
 1946-1947 — Aleksandr Egolin
 1947-1957 — Valery Druzin
 1957-1989 — Georgy Kholopov
 1989-1991 — Gennady Nikolaev
 1992-        — Yakov Gordin and Andrey Aryev

Circulation 
 1927 — 5,000 
 1954 — 60,000
 1975-1983 — about 115,000 
 1987 — 140,000
 1989 — 190,000
 1990 — 344,000
 1991 — 141,000
 2005 — 4,300
 2006 — 3,400

References

External links 
  (in Russian)

1924 establishments in the Soviet Union
Bi-monthly magazines
Magazines established in 1924
Magazines published in Saint Petersburg
Russian-language magazines
Literary magazines published in Russia
Monthly magazines published in Russia
Literary magazines published in the Soviet Union